jPod is a Canadian comedy-drama television series based on Douglas Coupland's 2006 novel of the same name. It premiered on CBC Television on January 8, 2008. Starting with the fifth episode, the show began airing Fridays at 9:00.

On March 7, 2008, it was announced that the CBC had cancelled the show due to low ratings. All of the remaining episodes—apart from episode 11, which was skyped and made available online—were broadcast.

The show's opening title theme is "Flutter" by Bonobo. Produced by I’m Feeling Lucky Productions for the CBC, jPod was created by Coupland and Michael MacLennan. Coupland also co-wrote many of the sole season's episodes.

Overview

jPod chronicles the often shocking lives of Ethan Jarlewski and four of his co-workers at Neotronic Arts as they confront "Chinese gangs, boneheaded bosses, sexual swinging, British royalty and gore-laced video games." The pod was created by a Y2K glitch, which caused workers with surnames beginning with the letter J to be grouped together. The group works in a pod in the basement and were nicknamed jPod by the company. jPod is made up of Ethan, Bree, Cancer Cowboy and John Doe. The newest member of jPod is Katilin Joyce, who appears to have been hired a day or two before the series begins.

The series begins as the Pod receives a new boss, Steve, who instantly begins to change jPod's game. The team struggles to cope with the changes and tries to keep their game afloat. But even with massive changes in the office, they don't ever change their priority: doing as little work as possible and goofing around.

Ethan, the protagonist, has bigger problems than changes at work. While both his parents, Jim and Carol, appear to be normal middle class suburbanites, they both have strange lives and activities. Frequently their activities cause disasters and they rely on Ethan to bail them out. Carol runs a large marijuana grow-op in her basement in order to fund her retirement. Unfortunately problems with dealers, dead and alive, often lead to her calling Ethan and demanding his assistance. Jim is attempting to become an actor but due to his lack of talent, fails to get speaking roles. He has occasional affairs, loves to ballroom dance and mostly hangs out with Kam Fong, a Chinese mobster. Ethan is very attracted to Kaitlin, but the arrivals of their old flames, as well as ongoing drama in Ethan's life, and chaos at Neotronic, keeps coming between them.

As the series progresses, Steve falls in love with Carol and attempts to win her heart. Jim becomes jealous and asks Kam Fong to deal with Steve. Steve disappears and leaves the jPod employees without a boss. Steve is replaced with Alistair, an insane but genius designer, who makes life in jPod miserable. Eventually, Ethan manages to get Alistair to leave the pod alone, in exchange for meeting Alistair's deadlines. Shortly after, Ethan discovers that Jim was involved in Steve's disappearances and demands to know what happened. Jim explains that Kam Fong smuggled Steve to China and he is now working in a factory. Ethan and a coworker, Cowboy, go to China to rescue Steve. They bring Steve back to Vancouver, Canada (The mentioned setting In Episode 1) but realize that after working in the sweatshop, he is addicted to heroin. jPod warns Steve that he either needs to quit heroin or at least become a high functioning addict or he will get fired. He refuses and eventually gets fired.

After a fight with Jim, Carol leaves Jim and moves to a lesbian commune on the Sunshine Coast. As she leaves, she accidentally runs over Steve. She doesn't realize she hit him and drives away. Jim finds Steve's body, realizes what happened and asks Ethan to help dispose of it. They do not want to contact the police as they don't want Carol to know she killed Steve. They bury the body and send a letter to Steve's son to explain his disappearance. After a few weeks alone, Jim decided that he cannot live without Carol and decides he will do whatever it takes to win her back.

To replace Steve, Katilin, a jPod member, is promoted and is placed in charge. But the new position is short-lived. A computer glitch causes jPod to be disbanded and the five must seek new positions within the company. They each begin to work in their 'ideal' sections but find they miss jPod. They decide to put together a farewell to jPod video, composed of all the goriest material they created. They insert the video into a company board meeting presentation and shock the administration of Neotronic Arts. The pod admits they probably will get fired for this but agree it was worth it. While John Doe, Cowboy, and Bree head off to play a last game of Defendoids, Ethan finally expresses his feelings with Kaitlin and they share a passionate kiss. When Ethan heads off to get a parting present for Kaitlin, Kaitlin gets one last hug from the hug machine. The machine is connected to a jealous artificial intelligence and crushes Katilin. By the time she is found by her co-workers, she has fallen into a coma.

The series ends at this point and it can be assumed that in either another unaired episode or a second season, the cliffhangers would be resolved. As the series was canceled, viewers are forced to guess whether Kaitlin recovers, whether the pod is indeed fired, if Carol and Jim get back together and what Ethan does with his future.

Main cast and characters
 David Kopp as Ethan Jarlewski, a twenty-something "gore specialist". Ethan was in med school until he dropped out to work at Neotronic Arts, presumably just before January 1, 2000. He is caring but long-suffering and spends most of his time fixing the lives of people around him. He likes to collect sneakers, old computers, old video games, IKEA products and Kaitlin.
 Emilie Ullerup as Kaitlin Joyce, the newest jPod member, an American and a former employee of Apple Inc. Kaitlin grew up in poverty but managed to break free by being paid to be a surrogate mother. Unfortunately, her pregnancy stopped her from gaining her high school diploma, which she later gains during the series. She is perky, eager to please the management and desperate to leave jPod. She eventually settles in and enjoys the environment, while still being the hardest working member of jPod. She and Ethan begin to date late in the series. She was once seriously overweight but lost 150 lbs. on the "Underground Sandwich Diet".
 Steph Song as Bree Jyang, a perfectionist and a "Junior Cougar". Bree's Chinese parents raised her with extremely high standards and often made her feel inadequate for not being born a male. This results in perfectionist behavior. Bree is a 'junior cougar' or a "puma". She is training to become a "cougar" (an older woman who preys of younger men for dates) and attends meetings with women who have the same goal. She and John Doe begin to date mid series.
 Ben Ayres as Cancer Cowboy (real name Casper Jesperson), a chain smoking sex addict who likes to drink cough syrup for a buzz. His parents told him that all the cowboys were dying of lung cancer, in order to scare him out of smoking. The plan backfired, as Cowboy started smoking because he thought it was cool. Cowboy's parents died in a murder-suicide pact when he was ten. This has left him with a morbid obsession with death. He went to Yale, and is an extremely talented coder.
 Torrance Coombs as John Doe, a twenty-something who attempts to be as statistically normal as possible. After being raised on a lesbian commune, with no television, radio, soda or other men, John Doe decided he wanted to reverse the weirdness of his past by being as normal as possible. His original real name was crow well mountain juniper (no capitals) but he had it legally changed to John Doe shortly before the series began. John is a virgin, but very talented at cunnilingus.
 Colin Cunningham as Steve Lefkowitz, the new boss of jPod. Steve is very friendly, emotional and likes to hug. He has a son named Connor and is attempting to gain custody of him. In the meantime, Steve makes up for not being able to see Connor by adding things Connor likes to Board-X, such as turtles. Steve falls in love with Carol, which leads to him being kidnapped, forced to work in a Chinese sweatshop and become addicted to heroin. He is eventually fired from Neotronic Arts and then killed when hit by a car.
 Sherry Miller as Carol Jarlewski, Ethan's mother. While appearing to be a classic uptight housewife and mother, Carol is involved in grow-ops, drug dealing and murders. The daughter of a police officer, Carol has an extensive gun collection with which she is very proficient. Her longing to be a grandmother causes her to badger her sons and interfere in their lives. Late in the series, she moves to a lesbian commune.
 Peter Benson as Greg Jarlewski, Ethan's older brother who is a real estate agent and dates cougars (older women who like younger men). He is a friend of Kam Fong.
 Alan Thicke as Jim Jarlewski, Ethan's father. Jim is attempting to become an actor but has no talent so he remains an extra. He is a ballroom dancing champion and occasionally cheats on his wife, Carol. When things get messy in his life, he turns to his friend Kam Fong to provide instant solutions.
 Raugi Yu as Kam Fong, a Chinese mobster. Kam is involved in human trafficking, drugs, pornography, rigging games shows and various other illegal activities. Kam is an avid ladies' man. He lives to ballroom dance and spend time with Jim. He makes a great friend but a dangerous enemy. He is shown to despise Ethan a little bit.

Cancellation
On March 7, 2008, CBC Television announced the cancellation of jPod. After earning high praise from some critics but little viewership, CBC moved the program to Friday nights, which may have had a negative effect on its ratings.  "jPod has been in trouble since February, when CBC moved it from mid-week to Friday night, when viewers are difficult to attract."

DVD release
On September 9, 2008, Morningstar Entertainment released a region-free DVD set in Canada containing all 13 episodes of jPod, with bonus features including deleted and alternate scenes, including segments from the unaired pilot, a gag reel, animations and interstitials.

A pressing error forces playback of Episode 8, The Last Shot, to be forward partway through the episode to the next episode on the disc. Morningstar soon offered a disc replacement program to those with an affected set.

Digital distribution
In Canada, jPod is available streaming on demand on the CBC's jPod website. A first for scripted television on the network, who previously had dabbled with online distribution with its news programming. jPod is seen as an early step in the CBC's digital distribution plans, which includes releasing programs via BitTorrent.

jPod also is available streaming on demand on the relaunch of The WB in the summer of 2008 at TheWB.com. Intellectual property restrictions prevent those without American IP addresses from viewing the series on The WB.

The show is also in syndication on local CBS, NBC, ABC and Fox stations in the US.

The show was also released on iTunes
.  There was originally a file error on iTunes which causes Episode 8: The Last Shot to play in lieu of Episode 9: Fine China. iTunes has subsequently corrected the file contents and released an update to customers who purchased the series.

In the UK, the full series of jPod is available on Netflix UK and the Virgin On Demand service in both SD and HD to XL subscribers only, as well as offering the first four episodes on the Virgin Central channel in June 2009.

Soundtrack

Episode 1: I Love Turtles
 Fndmntl - Celly Cue
 The Tragically Hip - Flamenco
 Tegan and Sara - Walking With A Ghost
 Bonobo - Noctuary
 Stars - What The Snowman Learned About Love

Episode 2: A Fine Bro-Mance
 Chromeo - Tenderoni
 Cassette Won't Listen - The Sidewalk Cruise
 Bonobo - Noctuary
 Joel Plaskett - Fashionable People
 Linda Martinez - Cha Cha
 Bonobo - Ketto
 Linda Martinez - High Society Social
 Thaddeus Hillary - Dance And Swing
 Mr. Scruff - Blackpool Roll
 The Dragons - Food For My Soul

Episode 3: Emo-tion Capture
 Bonobo - Wayward Bob
 Datarock - Fa-Fa-Fa
 Bonobo - Ketto
 DJ Vadim - Black Is The Night
 Bonobo - The Plug
 Sorce and Smoxz - Spank Pod
 Young & Sexy - Life Through One Speaker
 Robert Cote Jr. - Lay Me Down
 Milosh - It's Over

Episode 4: Feed The Need
 Elliot Lipp - Flashlight
 Datarock - The Most Beautiful Girl In The World
 Bonobo - Transmission 94
 Panurge - Listen To Your Own

Episode 5: Crappy Birthday to You
 Pointed Sticks - What Do You Want Me To Do
 Chromeo - My Girl Is Calling Me A Liar
 Ethan's Karaoke Version - All Out Of Love

Episode 6: The Hero's Journey
 Cold Cut - Man In The Garage
 Fndmntl - Bodega Dub
 Nasty On - You're No Good
 Dream Life Misery - Out Of Nowhere
 Mr. Scruff - Sea Mammal
 Sons Of Freedom - You're No Good
 Cassettes Won't Listen - The Sidewalk Cruise
 When In Rome - The Promise
 The Seams - Things Are Gonna Get Worse

Episode 7: SpriteQuest
 Bonobo - Walk In The Sky
 Elliot Lipp - Neutral
 Bonobo feat. Fink - If You Stayed Over
 Datarock - Night Flight To Uranus
 Cassettes Won't Listen - To Have A Crush
 Sorce - Breakin' Ass
 Telefon Tel Aviv - John Thomas On The Inside Is Nothing But Foam

Episode 8: The Last Shot
 Bonobo - Noctuary
 The Dragons - Sandman
 Fndmntl - Camouflage
 Stars - What The Snowman Learned About Love
 Remy Shand - Everlasting
 Stars - Elevator Love Letter

Episode 9: Fine China
 The Payolas - China Boys
 Agoria - Baboul Hair Cutton' feat. Scalde
 Fink - If Only

Episode 10: The Betty and Veronica Syndrome
 Fndmntl - Buttergroove
 Bonobo - Ketto
 Fink - Pretty Little Thing

Episode 11: Senseless Prom Death
 Fndmntl - Buttergroove
 Steve Rio - Shine On Me
 Fndmntl - Fireside
 Fndmntl - Minutae5
 Eliot Lipp - Neutral
 Cinematic Orchestra - To Build A Home
 Images In Vogue - Call It Love
 Men Without Hats - The Safety Dance
 Sheriff - When I'm With You
 Payolas - Eyes Of A Stranger
 Neverending White Lights - Always

Episode 12: Steve Leaves
 Fndmntl - Why
 Bonobo - The Fever
 The Awkward Stage - West Van Girl
 Panurge - Black Box
 Bonobo - Between The Lines
 Tegan & Sara - Back In Your Head

Episode 13: Colony Collapse Disorder
 Panurge - Le Petit Citrouille
 Echo Pilot - Woob Ray Dub
 Sinewave - A Ton Of Automotons
 Veal - Skid
 Othello 9 - Droan
 Fink - So Long
 Bonobo - The Plug
 Cassettes Won't Listen - To Have A Crush
 Fischerspooner - Emerge
 Telefon Tel Aviv - Sound In A Dark Room
 Honeycut - The Day I Turned To Glass

References

External links

 jPod streaming episodes on the CBC
 jPod streaming episodes on The WB
 

2000s Canadian comedy-drama television series
2000s Canadian workplace comedy television series
2008 Canadian television series debuts
2008 Canadian television series endings
CBC Television original programming
Television shows about video games
Television shows based on Canadian novels
Television shows filmed in Vancouver
Television shows set in Vancouver
Triad (organized crime)